Theodore High School is a four-year senior high school located in Theodore, Alabama, United States. The school operates in the Mobile County Public School System. There are roughly 1,700 students and 100-110 staff members at the school.

It serves: Theodore, a portion of Tillmans Corner, and portions of the St. Elmo area.

Feeder patterns
The following middle schools feed into Theodore High School :

Portions of the attendance zone:
 Burns Middle School
 
 Hankins Middle School

Athletics

Theodore's athletic teams plays in the Alabama High School Athletic Association Class 7A Region 1. The mascot for the athletic teams is the Bobcats. Eric Collier has led the Bobcats to multiple playoff visits. Under Collier, the football team has posted a 62–40 record between 2013 and 2022.

Theodore has only one state championship in boys track and field (1992). But has visited the state championship consecutively since (2011-2013). Theodore also has two more state championships in boys indoor track and field (1992) and (1999).

School uniforms
Theodore's school uniforms consist of red, white, black polo or oxford style shirts.
Pants: (girls)khaki pant or Bermuda style shorts
Pants: (boys) same as girls
Shoes: brown or black leather shoes
Belts: any. (as of 2010)

Administration
Principal
Chip Menton

Asst Principals
Roger Jenkins 
Dr. Betty Patterson Dixon 
Tim Hardegree

Accreditation
Theodore High School is accredited by the Southern Association of Colleges and Schools Council on Accreditation and School Improvement and the Commission on International and Trans-Regional Accreditation for 2007 and, therefore, is entitled to all the services and privileges of regional, national, and international professional recognition.

History
Theodore High School was founded in 1920. The school was moved to its new location and building in 1984. Theodore High School is located in the southern section of the county near world-famous Bellingrath Gardens.

The school has an enrollment of approximately 1600 students in grades 9–12.

Notable alumni

 La'Mical Perine, NFL football running back
 Lyneal Alston, football wide receiver
 Scott Bolton, football wide receiver
 Etric Pruitt, Former NFL professional football player
 Kentrail Davis, professional baseball player
 Hanford Dixon, football cornerback
 Shelby Lynne, singer and songwriter
 C. J. Mosley, football linebacker
 Jo Ann Jenkins, class of 1976, CEO of AARP
 Frank Bolter, spotter for the 2014 Indianapolis 500 winner Ryan Hunter-Reay and NASCAR driver Kyle Busch.
 Christopher Murrill, professional baseball player

References

Public high schools in Alabama
Educational institutions established in 1920
High schools in Mobile County, Alabama
1920 establishments in Alabama